Ka-Bala was a talking board game manufactured and released by Transogram in 1967. It was marketed under the slogan, "The Mysterious Game that Tells the Future."

The game was molded out of green plastic that glowed in the dark.  It sat upon a hemispherical rocker, and was operated by the players touching the "solary projectors", which were handles on either side of the game. Unlike most talking boards which are activated by a planchette, Ka-Bala used a large black marble as an indicator; the marble ran around a circular track on the surface of the game. In addition to indicating the letters and numbers printed around the track, the marble could also be used to select one of twenty-two Major Arcana cards of occult tarot supplied with the game. Each tarot card had the fortune it predicted printed on the back. The game also had the twelve zodiac signs marked along the track; these could be used to generate a simple horoscope. In the center of the rocking board, the "Eye of Zohar" was mounted; this plastic eyeball would spin as the board was agitated by the players.

The name "Ka-Bala" and the reference to the Zohar indicate that the game was supposedly related to Kabbalah, an esoteric school of thought in Jewish mysticism. As they operated the game, the players were instructed to chant Pax, sax, sarax; hola, noa, nostra!

See also 
 Fortune teller machine
 Magic 8 Ball

External links
 Ka-Bala at the online Museum of Talking Boards.

Board games introduced in 1967
Divination software and games